Danda Bazar  is a village development committee in Dhankuta District in the Kosi Zone of eastern Nepal. At the time of the 1991 Nepal census it had a population of 2476 people living in 508 individual households.

References

Populated places in Dhankuta District